The Tamil Nadu Handloom Weavers' Cooperative Society, popularly known as Co-optex, is a cooperative of traditional handloom weavers of the Indian state of Tamil Nadu. This is under the control of Department of Handlooms, Handicrafts, Textiles and Khadi (Tamil Nadu) of Government of Tamil Nadu. The organisation owns a number of shopping outlets in Tamil Nadu. Co-Optex also has an international arm, Co-optex International which exports its products to Germany, France, Netherlands, Belgium, Spain, Switzerland, Canada,  Greece, Hong Kong, U.K. South Africa and the U.A.E.

See also
 Khadi
 Khādī Development and Village Industries Commission (Khadi Gramodyog)
 Government of Tamil Nadu

References

External links
 Official website

Cooperatives in India
Companies based in Chennai
State agencies of Tamil Nadu
Handloom industry in India
Textile industry in Tamil Nadu
Indian companies established in 1935
Manufacturing companies established in 1935